Mike Fitzgerald or Mike FitzGerald may refer to:

 Mike Fitzgerald (sociologist) (born 1951), academic and consultant
 Mike Fitzgerald (American football) (born 1941), former American football player
 Mike Fitzgerald (catcher) (born 1960), catcher in Major League Baseball
 Mike Fitzgerald (first baseman) (born 1964), first baseman in Major League Baseball
 Mike Fitzgerald (game designer), designer of collectible card games
 Mike FitzGerald (hurler) (born 1985), Irish hurler
 Mike Fitzgerald (outfielder) (1891–1945), outfielder in Major League Baseball
 Michael J. Fitzgerald (writer) (born 1957), author also known as Mike

See also
 Michael Fitzgerald (disambiguation)